SK Latvijas Avīze was a floorball team based in Riga, Latvia playing in the Latvian Floorball League.

Goaltenders
35  Jāzeps Linde
38  Mārtiņš Krūms

Defencemen
10  Māris Zicmanis
12  Toms Briedis
15  Alvis Veipāns
25  Edgars Dzeguze
33  Ainārs Anis
44  Jānis Anis
47  Remārs Vikānis
73  Dmitrijs Dmitrijevs

Forwards
  3  Pēteris Freimanis
  4  Krišjānis Zeps
  5  Kenneth Marius Grimshei
  8  Ivo Preiss
  9  Uldis Purvišķis
13  Ainars Juskevics
18  Toms Rutkis
20  Ritvars Rebainis
28  Jānis Kokins
34  Kārlis Bulāns
71  Gatis Miglāns
77  Andis Blinds
78  Atis Blinds (captain)
88  Oskars Kirkils
93  Krists Paulovičs

References
Latvijas Avīze/LU official web site

Floorball in Latvia
Latvian floorball teams